Obatala is an orisha in the Yoruba mythology that was given the task to create the Earth but failed the task by being drunk on palm wine and was outshined by his little brother Oduduwa. As punishment for his negligence to an important task he was given the job to create humans beings. This was authorized by his father, Olodumare which gave Obatala the name sculptor of mankind. According to Yoruba myths, Obatala was in charge of the complexion of humans after moulding them. Those he fairly burnt ended up being the Europeans(Whites) while those he forgot in the fire due to his drunkenness ended up being the Africans(ebony). Those he forgot to burn are the present day 'albino'. "Now Olodumare [the supreme being] once called on Obatala and told him that he would love him to assist in creating human beings that would live in the world he was about to create. This is because as he (Olodumare) said further he would not like the world he was planning to create to exist without human beings." While Obatala worked on his task with the assistance of Osun. He was successful at creating human beings with water and clay, but during the creation phase he had become drunk with to much palm wine due to thirst. Causing him to create human beings with disabilities. When his mind became clear and saw his mistake. He vowed to never drink again and reinvented himself as The Great White God and the protect of people with disabilities. Due to this reinvention, he was given ascendancy over human beings.  

According to the oral traditions of Ife, the mortal Obatala was the founder of and the king of Ife during its classical period. His position as the King was challenged by Oduduwa who assumed leadership of the town for a brief moment. However, Obatala was able to emerge victorious in the contest and it led to the murder of his rival Oduduwa and the retrieval of his throne.

While there exists an Obatala in the Yoruba pantheon. The understanding of the qualities of the Obatala god was merged into the human Obatala that ruled in Ife upon his posthumous deification. Thus, the human Obatala who was the king at Ife was admitted to the Yoruba pantheon as an aspect of the primordial divinity of the same name.

Mythology 
According to Yoruba mythology, Obatala is one of the oldest of all of the orishas and was granted authority to create the Earth. Due to Obatala being drunk, Oduduwa took this opportunity to show his worth to his father. He took the satchel that Olodumare had given Obatala to aid him in creation and used it to create land on the primeval ocean. Odudwa did such a great job that Olodumare granted him the title "God of the Earth."

Due to this Obatala was given the task to create human beings. With this task he takes a "long gold chain, a snail's shell filled with sand, a white hen, a black cat, and a palm nut"  and climbs down to the end of the chain.

He releases the white hen that spreads the sand from the shell to create mountains and valleys, planted  and the palm nut to create a forest.

After being content with what he created, he started to mold human beings from clay. During this creation progress he was drinking a large amount of palm wine, created from the palm nut forest, which cause him to create deformed figures in his drunken state.

When he became sober and realize what he has done, he vowed to never drink again and protect the people with disabilities.

After he successfully created the human being figures, they were given ase, a copper knife, and a wooden hoe. They were able to prosper.

In Africa

Primordial Obatala

According to the tenets of the Yoruba religion, Obatala is one of the oldest of all of the orishas and was granted authority to create the Earth. A tradition states that before he could return to heaven and report to Olodumare, Oduduwa usurped his responsibility (due to Obatala's being drunk at the time). He took the satchel that Olodumare had given Obatala to aid him in creation and used it to create land on the primeval ocean. A great feud ensued between the two siblings. However, an assessment of Yoruba traditional religion shows that each of the 201 deity are understood by their descendants and adherents to have carried out the creation of the earth. This suggests beginning of the world is an aspect of Yoruba cosmogenesis associated with numerous deities in Yoruba pantheons beyond Obatala or Oduduwa.

Mortal Obatala
Oba Obatala was the founder and the King of Ile-Ife, hence the appellation, Olufe. His reign was disrupted by an usurpation led by Oduduwa and his supporters such as Obameri, Obadio, Aloran, Ejio and Apata. However, Obatala was able to facilitate the death of Oduduwa and retrieve his throne as the king of Ile-Ife with the assistance of his support base consisting of Oluorogbo, Orunmila, Akire, Obalufon Ogbogboinrin (Obamakin), Owa Ilare and numerous others. This is re-enacted every year in the Obatala festival in Ife and the coronation rites of Ooni which indicate Obatala’s ownership of the crown, throne and authority. Ultimately, following the war between Obatala on the one hand and Oduduwa on the other, the latter lost and his support based dispersed. Thus, leading to a rotated rulership between the lineages of Obatala and Obalufon Ogbogbodinrin (Obamakin) who succeeded him. This was in effect till a coup conducted by Lajamisan, a descendant of Oranfe, disrupted the ruling structure.

In the Americas

Santería

Obatalá (also known as Ochalá or Oxalá; Orichalá or Orixalá) is the oldest "orisha funfun" ("white deity"), referring to purity, both physically and symbolically as in the "light" of consciousness. In Santería, Obatalá is syncretized with Our Lady of Mercy and Jesus Of Nazareth. Obatalá is said to have an equal number of male paths as female paths, but more often crowns women in part because men are traditionally crowned in Ifá in many lineages.

Candomblé
In Candomblé, Oxalá (Obatalá) has been syncretized with Our Lord of Bonfim; in that role, he is the patron saint of Bahia. The extensive use of white clothing, which is associated with the worship of Oxalá, has become a symbol of Candomblé in general. Friday is the day dedicated to the worship of Oxalá. A large syncretic religious celebration of the Festa do Bonfim in January in Salvador celebrates both Oxalá and Our Lord of Bonfim; it includes the washing of the church steps with a special water, made with flowers.

Snails
The snail Achatina fulica is used for religious purposes in Brazil as an offering to Obatala. It is seen as a substitute for the African giant snail (Archachatina marginata) that is used in Yorubaland because they are known by the same name (Igbin, also known as Ibi) in both Brazil and Yorubaland.

Offerings and rituals 

In terms of offering to orishas, Female orishas (Iabás) "eat" female animals, while male Orishas (Borós) "eat" male animals. However, Obatala is the only male orisha who "eats" in the Iabás circle, thus accepting sacrifices of female animals in his honor. Bastide, commented on the androgynous characteristics of Obatala as an explanation of why this orisha accepts female animals as offerings. According to some priests, however, Obatala does not have a sex, since, according to the myths, he is the Father of Creation. Obatala is therefore the equivalent of God in the catholic syncretism who also does not have a specific sex.

Unlike other Orisha, Obatala only accepts offerings cooked in honey, as he has a distaste for dende oil.

Like any other Orisha, Obatala does not specifically eat the offering himself, but consumes the energy of the offering, or Axé. The expression "eat" is used as a symbolism for a spiritual form of feeding. Orishas do not "come down" from the spiritual plain to eat (literally speaking) the animal being offered.

Traditionally speaking, for sacrificial offerings to Obatala, considered an orixá-funfun (literally "white orisha"), the animals or their parts should be completely white, such as the white blood of the mollusk called Igbin (Achatina fulica).

Oriki (praise names) 
 Oluwa Aye - Lord of the Earth
 Alabalashe - He who has divine authority
 Baba Arugbo - Old Master or Father
 Baba Araye - Master or Father of all human beings
 Orishanla (also spelled Orishainla or Oshanla) - the arch divinity
 Olufe - King of Ife or Lord of Ife
 Oseremagbo - King of Ugbo

See also

Bibliography
 Idowu, E. Bolaji: Olodumare: God in Yoruba Belief, London 1962.
 Elebuibon, Yemi:  Adventures of Obatala, Pt. 2.
 Lange, Dierk: "The dying and the rising God in the New Year Festival of Ife", in: Lange, Ancient Kingdoms of West Africa, Dettelbach 2004, pp. 343–376.

References

Yoruba gods
Creator gods
Sky and weather gods